Adam Goljan (born 15 April 2001) is a professional Slovak footballer who currently plays for Sparta Prague B as a forward.

Club career

MŠK Žilina
Goljan made his Fortuna Liga debut for Žilina against ViOn Zlaté Moravce on 13 February 2021. He came on in the second half, replacing Patrik Iľko. The match resulted in a decisive 4:1 victory.

References

External links
 MŠK Žilina official club profile 
 
 Futbalnet profile 
 

2001 births
Living people
Sportspeople from Žilina
Slovak footballers
Slovakia youth international footballers
Slovakia under-21 international footballers
Association football forwards
MŠK Žilina players
AC Sparta Prague players
2. Liga (Slovakia) players
Slovak Super Liga players
Czech National Football League players